Elric: Song of the Black Sword is a story collection by Michael Moorcock published by White Wolf in 1995.

Plot summary
Elric: Song of the Black Sword is the fifth volume of the collected Eternal Champion series, and is the first to deal with Elric as Prince of Melnibone.

Reception
Andy Butcher reviewed Elric: Song of the Black Sword for Arcane magazine, rating it a 9 out of 10 overall. Butcher comments that "if you have any interest at all in fantasy literature, this volume is as much required reading as Tolkien's Lord Of The Rings. Moorcock's work has been at least as influential, and Elric in particular is one of the best-known characters in the genre. Moorcock's writing style may not be the best, but these are classic stories, and are just as fresh and imaginative today as they ever were".

Reviews
Review by Howard V. Hendrix (1996) in The New York Review of Science Fiction, October 1996.

References

1995 novels
Books by Michael Moorcock